Benjamin Schnetzer (born February 8, 1990) is an American actor. He was nominated for two British Independent Film Awards for his performance in the film Pride (2014).

Early life 
Schnetzer was born and raised in New York City, the son of actors Stephen Schnetzer and Nancy Snyder. He graduated from the Guildhall School of Music and Drama in London.

Career 
In 2010, Schnetzer appeared in an episode of Law & Order and had a supporting role in the  ABC series Happy Town.

As he began appearing in British films, Schnetzer was praised for his "superb mastery of accents". During his final year at Guildhall, he landed the role of Max Vandenburg in the film adaptation of The Book Thief (2013). The following year, he starred as activist Mark Ashton in the historical film Pride, for which he received critical acclaim and two BIFA nominations. That same year, he played English-Greek Oxford University student Dimitri Mitropoulos in The Riot Club.

Schnetzer starred as Brad Land alongside Nick Jonas in Goat, a 2016 film about college hazing. That same year, he starred as Ross in Punk's Dead as well as appearing in Warcraft and Snowden. He played British-Kenyan journalist Dan Eldon in the biopic The Journey Is the Destination.

Schnetzer returned to television in 2018 with a role as Marcus Goldman in the Epix miniseries adaptation of Joël Dicker's The Truth About the Harry Quebert Affair. He made his Broadway debut in The Nap at Samuel J. Friedman Theatre. He had film roles in Entebbe, The Grizzlies, The Death & Life of John F. Donovan, and Saint Judy in 2018 as well as The Giant in 2019. Nell Meadow of RogerEbert.com called Schnetzer's performances "exceptional" in a 2020 review of The Grizzlies and praised ability to disappear into his roles in The Book Thief, Snowden, and Pride. 

In 2020, Schnetzer was cast as protagonist Yorick Brown in the 2021 FX on Hulu adaptation of the post-apocalyptic comic Y: The Last Man. He has an upcoming role in the Netflix science fiction series The Three-Body Problem.

In September 2022, Schnetzer will play Eli in the European premiere of Eureka Day at The Old Vic in London.

Personal life
Schnetzer is in a relationship with theatre director from Newcastle upon Tyne Kate Hewitt. They have a daughter, born 2021.

Filmography

Film

Television

Stage

Awards and nominations

References

External links
 

Living people
1990 births
Alumni of the Guildhall School of Music and Drama
American expatriate male actors in the United Kingdom
American expatriates in England
American male film actors
American male Shakespearean actors
American male stage actors
American male television actors
American people of German descent